Johann "Hans" Strnad (~1893 – ~1950) was an Austrian football player and manager.

Club career
Born in Vienna. While playing with Wiener Sport-Club, he played one match for the Austria national football team on April 14, 1918 in a match in Budapest against Hungary. He also played with DFC Prag.

Johann Strnad later became a coach. He coached 1. FC Katowice (1927–1928), SK Jugoslavija between 1928 and 1929, Czarni Lwów (1930–1931) and Hasmonea Lwów (1930–1931). By the time in Belgrad he was replaced by Dragan Jovanović, he was receiving a salary of 6.000 Dinars.  For a short period between 18 October 1930 and 18 February 1931, he coached Građanski Zagreb.  In 1933 he returned to Austria and became coach of his former club Wiener Sport-Club which he will coach in two periods, between 1933 and 1934, and 1936 and 1937. In 1947 coached Wacker Wien.

He also coached another Yugoslav club, HAŠK in the 1932–33 Yugoslav Football Championship.

International career
Hans Johann Strnad made one appearance for the Austria national team it was on April 14, 1918, in Budapest against Hungary, a 2–0 defeat.

References

External links
 

Footballers from Vienna
Austrian footballers
Austria international footballers
Wiener Sport-Club players
Association football forwards
Austrian football managers
SK Jugoslavija managers
Panathinaikos F.C. managers
Expatriate football managers in Yugoslavia
Expatriate football managers in Czechoslovakia
Year of birth uncertain
DFC Prag players
Wiener Sport-Club managers
HŠK Građanski Zagreb managers